Siyabonga Nhlapo (born 23 December 1988) is a South African soccer player who plays as a midfielder for Supersport United FC in the Premier Soccer League.

References

External links

1988 births
Living people
Sportspeople from Soweto
South African soccer players
Association football midfielders
Jomo Cosmos F.C. players
Bidvest Wits F.C. players
Highlands Park F.C. players
SuperSport United F.C. players
2015 Africa Cup of Nations players
South African Premier Division players
National First Division players
South Africa international soccer players